Wettsteiniola is a genus of flowering plants belonging to the family Podostemaceae.

It is native to Brazil.

Known species:
 Wettsteiniola accorsii (Toledo) P.Royen 
 Wettsteiniola apipensis Tur 
 Wettsteiniola pinnata Suess. 

The genus name of Wettsteiniola is in honour of Richard Wettstein (1863–1931), an Austrian botanist. 
It was first described and published in Repert. Spec. Nov. Regni Veg. Vol.39 on page 18 in 1935.

References

Podostemaceae
Malpighiales genera
Plants described in 1935
Flora of Brazil